The 1908 Tennessee Volunteers football team represented the University of Tennessee in the 1908 Southern Intercollegiate Athletic Association football season.  The season was the second of head coach George Levene's three-year tenure.

Schedule

Season summary

North Carolina
Fullback Clarence McCollum returned a fumble 75 yards against North Carolina.

Maryville
In the second week of play, the Vols beat Maryville 39–5.

Kentucky State
Tennessee celebrated the victory over Kentucky State 7–0, as they were outweighed 10 pounds to the man. A 40-yard run by Leach set up an offtackle run by Peery.

Georgia
Leach scored all of Tennessee's points in the 10–0 victory over Georgia with a 30-yard fumble return for a touchdown and a 40-yard field goal.

Georgia Tech
Tennessee defeated John Heisman's Georgia Tech team 6–5, "in a game in which they clearly outplayed the Yellow Jackets". Tech scored first thanks to three consecutive completed forward passes. Perry scored Tennessee's touchdown. He scored another just after the referee blew the whistle to end the contest.

at Vanderbilt

1908 was a down year for Vanderbilt with a wealth of sophomores; guided shrewdly by McGugin to its success. Vanderbilt won the match between the two schools 16 to 9.

Walker Leach made a 41-yard field goal to put the Vols up 4 to 0. "This seemed to arouse the local team" and Vanderbilt drove down the field for a touchdown. On a fake kick, Leach circled Vanderbilt's left end for 60 yards. Ray Morrison stopped him short of the goal.

Clemson
Tennessee also edged Clemson 6–5.

Chattanooga
The Vols beat Chattanooga 39–5.

Alabama
Alabama surprised with the 4 to 0 victory over Tennessee to close the season.

Postseason
Walker Leach and Nathan Dougherty were selected All-Southern. Vanderbilt coach Dan McGugin noted "All things considered, Leach was perhaps the best football player of the year in  Dixie."

References

Additional sources
 

Tennessee
Tennessee Volunteers football seasons
Tennessee Volunteers football